Nargiz Pashayeva (born 12 May 1987) is an Azerbaijani former footballer who played as a forward. She has been a member of the Azerbaijan women's national team.

References

1987 births
Living people
Women's association football forwards
Azerbaijani women's footballers
Azerbaijan women's international footballers